Elections to the French National Assembly were held in Mayotte on 12 March 1978. The territory elected a single seat, won by Younoussa Bamana of the Mahoré People's Movement.

Results

References

Mayotte
Elections in Mayotte
1978 in Mayotte
March 1978 events in Africa
Election and referendum articles with incomplete results